Davide Borsellini (born 4 January 1999) is an Italian footballer who plays as a goalkeeper.

Club career
Borsellini made his professional debut in the Lega Pro for Paganese on 16 January 2016 in a game against Foggia.

He was included in the Udinese's Serie A squad for the first time on 5 February 2017, when he was an unused backup for Orestis Karnezis in a game against Chievo.

On 7 August 2018, Borsellino signed with Serie C club Rende on a 2-year contract.

On 5 October 2020 he joined Viterbese on a two-year contract. On 1 February 2021, he was loaned to Lecco.

References

External links
 

Living people
1999 births
Footballers from Rome
Italian footballers
Association football goalkeepers
Serie C players
Paganese Calcio 1926 players
Udinese Calcio players
Rende Calcio 1968 players
U.S. Viterbese 1908 players
Calcio Lecco 1912 players